"Monty" is a song by Australian alternative rock band, Spiderbait and was released in September 1995 as the second single from the band's second studio album The Unfinished Spanish Galleon of Finley Lake. The single became the band's first charting single, peaked at number 44 on the Australian chart. The song ranked at number 43 on Triple J's Hottest 100 in 1995. This single also includes a demo    of the song 'Jesus', which was originally released on a 7" single.

Track listings

Charts

Release history

References

 

1995 singles
1995 songs
Spiderbait songs
Universal Music Australia singles